The 1985 Iowa State Cyclones football team represented Iowa State University as a member of the Big Eight Conference during the 1985 NCAA Division I-A football season. Led by third-year head coach Jim Criner, the Cyclones compiled an overall record of 5–6 with a mark of 3–4 in conference play, placing fifth in the Big 8. Iowa State played home games at Cyclone Stadium in Ames, Iowa.

Schedule

Game summaries

Iowa

at Oklahoma

at Nebraska

Oklahoma State

References

Iowa State
Iowa State Cyclones football seasons
Iowa State Cyclones football